"Maps" is a song by American indie rock band Yeah Yeah Yeahs from their debut full-length album, Fever to Tell (2003). The song is about the relationship between Liars frontman Angus Andrew and Yeah Yeah Yeahs lead singer Karen O. It was released 2003, and the band performed the song at that year's MTV Movie Awards. The music video received extensive play on MTV. It reached number nine on Billboards Alternative Songs chart and was included in the popular video game Rock Band.

Track listing

Music video
The video shows the band playing in an audition in a high school gymnasium, with different light filters changing the color of the room. Karen O's crying in the video was not staged. She explains: "They were real tears. My boyfriend at the time (Angus Andrew) was supposed to come to the shoot – he was three hours late and I was just about to leave for tour. I didn't think he was even going to come and this was the song that was written for him. He eventually showed up and I got myself in a real emotional state." Some have suggested the song title stands for  “My Angus Please Stay,” though this was never confirmed by the band. The video received substantial play on MTV. The video was nominated for four MTV Video Music Awards at the 2004 ceremony: Best Art Direction, Best Editing, Best Cinematography, and the MTV2 Award. It was directed by Patrick Daughters.

Notable cover versions
 The White Stripes at the Reading Festival 2004.
 Arcade Fire, on The Jo Whiley Show's Live Lounge.
 Ted Leo as part of a medley with Kelly Clarkson's "Since U Been Gone."
 Macy Gray on her album Covered.
 The Bad Plus on their album It's Hard.
Camp Cope covered the song for Triple J's Like A Version
Anderson Paak on his 2013 EP Cover Art
 Keaton Henson on his EP The Lucky EP.
 Freya Ridings as a 2017 promotional single.

Critical reception and legacy
"Maps" has received vast critical acclaim. Some examples:
 In 2009, it was voted the best alternative love song of all time by NME.
 The song was also listed at number six on Pitchfork Medias top 500 songs of the 2000s.
 Rolling Stone ranked "Maps" as the 7th best song of the 2000s.
 On April 7, 2011, Rolling Stone ranked "Maps" number 386 on their list of the 500 Greatest Songs of All Time. Its 2021 list placed it at number 101.
 In October 2011, NME placed it at number 55 on its list "150 Best Tracks of the Past 15 Years".
 NME ranked "Maps" at number 1 on their list of "Indie Weddings Songs: 20 Tracks Perfect For Your First Dance."

"Maps" served as an inspiration for Kelly Clarkson's 2004 hit song "Since U Been Gone," which was written and produced by Max Martin and Lukasz "Dr. Luke" Gottwald. In an interview with Billboard, Dr. Luke said:
That was a conscious move by Max and myself, because we were listening to alternative and indie music ... I said, "Ah, I love this song,' and Max was like, 'If they would just write a damn pop chorus on it!' It was driving him nuts, because that indie song was sort of on six, going to seven, going to eight, the chorus comes ... and it goes back down to five. It drove him crazy. And when he said that, it was like, light bulb. 'Why don't we do that, but put a big chorus on it?" It worked.

"Maps" and "Since U Been Gone" share similar introductions, post-chorus guitar breaks, middle eights, and are both in the key of G major. Karen O said noticing the similarity was "like getting bitten by a poisonous varmint."

"Hold Up," a song recorded by Beyoncé for her 2016 album, Lemonade, contains an interpolation of the "Maps" lyric, "Wait, they don't love you like I love you." Beyoncé sings the line as "Hold up, they don't love you like I love you," which was based on a 2011 tweet from Vampire Weekend frontman Ezra Koenig paraphrasing "Maps." Koenig and Diplo recorded a demo version of "Hold Up" in 2014 including the interpolated line, and when Beyoncé released the song on Lemonade, the three members of Yeah Yeah Yeahs shared in the songwriting credits.

Charts

References

External links
 Allmusic: [ Maps Entry]
 

2003 singles
Yeah Yeah Yeahs songs
2003 songs
Interscope Records singles
2000s ballads
Rock ballads
Songs written by Karen O
Songs written by Brian Chase
Songs written by Nick Zinner